Kosmos 327 ( meaning Cosmos 327), also known as DS-P1-I No.8 was a satellite which was used as a radar target for anti-ballistic missile tests. It was launched by the Soviet Union in 1970 as part of the Dnepropetrovsk Sputnik programme.

Launch 
It was launched aboard a Kosmos-2I 63SM rocket, from Site 133/1 at Plesetsk. The launch occurred at 14:39:56 UTC on 18 March 1970.

Orbit 
It decayed from orbit on 19 January 1971.

Kosmos 327 was the eighth of nineteen DS-P1-I satellites to be launched. Of these, all reached orbit successfully except the seventh.

References

Kosmos satellites
Spacecraft launched in 1970
1970 in the Soviet Union
Dnepropetrovsk Sputnik program